Vasily Vyacheslavovich Utkin (born in 1972)  is a Russian sports reporter, author, former host of the television show The Football Club, TV and radio presenter, entertainer, actor and a former co-owner of the Russian sport website Sports.ru.

Appointed Chief editor of the sports channels of  NTV Plus  in September 1, 2010 and was in place until change of structure to Match TV.

Utkin left Match TV after refusing to work with Tina Kandelaki in 2015.  In 2020 his views on poor governance in Russia were attacked by tv host Vladimir Solovyov.

Known also for shocking actions and statements, some even causing international scandals.

Utkin was assaulted twice in his career for outspoken views, in 2001 and 2019.  The latter he linked to former Russian National Team Head Coach Stanislav Cherchesov.

He is also an occasional actor who played part of a candidate for Governor Igor Tsaplin in Kvartet I's play Election Day and follow-up movies Election Day (2007) and Election Day 2 (2016).

References

External links
 Ofiicial site of Vasily Utkin
 Autobiography Vasily Utkin
 Conference Vasily Utkin on Sports.ru
 
 On Vasily Utkin attacked from behind

Russian journalists
Russian sports journalists
Writers from Moscow
1972 births
Living people
Russian association football commentators
People from Balashikha
Russian YouTubers
Russian activists against the 2022 Russian invasion of Ukraine

Russian columnists